Nina S. Zagat (née Safronoff) and her husband, Eugene Henry "Tim" Zagat, Jr. (born 1940, New York City) (pronounced ) are the founders and publishers of Zagat Restaurant Surveys. They met at Yale Law School and were both practicing attorneys when they founded Zagat Surveys.

Early life
The Zagats married during law school, graduated in 1966, and moved to New York where they became corporate lawyers.

Law careers
Nina Zagat was an associate with the Wall Street white shoe firm Shearman & Sterling, where she gained notability acting as Seward Johnson's attorney and author and executor of his 1983 will. She represented his widow, Barbara "Basia" Piasecka Johnson, while the will was contested by his children; The Washington Post quotes an affidavit by the children's attorney that described her relationship to her client as "a contemporary, traveling companion and close personal friend whose recompense for loyalty to and support of Basia was the extraordinary compensation." Zagat maintained that "she acted according to Seward's instructions" and the suit was settled out of court.

Both were employed in Paris—he at office of the Hughes Hubbard law firm, and she with Shearman & Sterling. While there, they started compiling their own list of Parisian restaurants, of what they liked and didn't like, and conceived the idea for a new type of restaurant ratings guide.

Zagat Survey

When the Zagats returned to New York, they solicited the opinions of friends about New York restaurants; the resulting compilation eventually became Zagat. They published their first guide in 1982, for New York City, selling 7,500 copies in local bookstores. Two years later, when selling 40,000 copies per year; they each quit their jobs as corporate lawyers to pursue the enterprise full-time.

One reviewer described the methodology: "The philosophy behind the Zagat Survey is that instead of one lengthy critical review of a restaurant, the eating public is better served by a rating based on hundreds of responses. By tabulating the responses to detailed surveys, the Zagat Survey rates restaurants on a 30-point scale in the categories of food, décor, service and cost. It also provides price estimates and a pithy, paragraph-sized description."

The company expanded to include other cities and market segments such as hotels, stores and clubs; in early 2008, the couple tried to sell the company for $200 million, but then withdrew the sale when they could not find prospective buyers at that price. One reviewer wrote: "The Zagat Survey was once the sine qua non of restaurant guidebooks. Aside from a review in the paper, the survey's 30-point scale for food, service, and décor—and its quirky comments submitted by readers—was pretty much all that mattered to restaurateurs. While the book's ratings are still highly influential—and while the company remains highly profitable—the guide is no longer the indispensable possession it once was and it's clear that its influence has waned in recent years." The relative decline was attributed to the company's "online strategy" which made the guide only available to paying subscribers.

Personal life
The Jewish-American couple have two sons, Ted and John, and live on the Upper West Side of Manhattan in New York. The pair were acquainted with Jeffrey Epstein and flew on his private plane dubbed the Lolita Express.

Stabbing incident
On November 15, 1990, Tim Zagat was watching Dances With Wolves at a Loews movie theater in New York City. An "apparently deranged" man, seated in the same row, made loud, obscene comments to others before the movie began. During the film, the man stabbed Zagat until an anonymous moviegoer pulled the attacker off of Zagat. The attacker fled out a side exit but police apprehended the suspect a few days later. Zagat received superficial wounds and was taken to Roosevelt Hospital.

References

External links

 Photo of Tim and Nina Zagat

Market researchers
Yale Law School alumni
New York (state) lawyers
Living people
American Jews
Corporate lawyers
People associated with Shearman & Sterling
Year of birth missing (living people)
American restaurant critics